Rafael Nadal defeated the defending champion Guillermo Coria in the final, 6–3, 6–1, 0–6, 7–5 to win the singles tennis title at the 2005 Monte Carlo Masters. It was his first Masters title, and the first of eleven titles at the Monte-Carlo Masters. Nadal became the youngest Masters champion since Michael Chang at the 1990 Canadian Open.

Seeds

Draw

Finals

Top half

Section 1

Section 2

Bottom half

Section 3

Section 4

External links
 Main draw
 Qualifying draw

Singles